Julie Becker (1972–2016) was an interdisciplinary American artist. She earned her BFA and MFA at CalArts in Los Angeles.  Becker earned early acclaim for her 1996 installation Researchers, Residents, A Place to Rest. Her works have appeared at the Whitney Museum of American Art and the Museum of Contemporary Art, Los Angeles and are included in the permanent collections of the Museum of Modern Art (MoMA), the Solomon R. Guggenheim Museum, the Hessel Museum of Art, the Denver Art Museum, and the Migros Museum of Contemporary Art. Her work is represented by Greene Naftali Gallery.

References 

21st-century American artists
California Institute of the Arts alumni
American installation artists
1972 births
2016 deaths
Artists from Los Angeles